Knutzy Knights is a 1954 short subject directed by Jules White starring American slapstick comedy team The Three Stooges (Moe Howard, Larry Fine and Shemp Howard). It is the 156th entry in the series released by Columbia Pictures starring the comedians, who released 190 shorts for the studio between 1934 and 1959.

Plot
The Stooges are troubadours sent to cheer up the brokenhearted Princess Elaine (Christine McIntyre). Her father, the King, (Vernon Dent) has pledged her hand in marriage to the Black Prince (Philip Van Zandt), but she loves Cedric, the local blacksmith (Jock Mahoney).

The Stooges try to intervene for Cedric by serenading Elaine (they sing a variation on the Sextette from "Lucia di Lammermoor", with lyrics telling Elaine that Cedric is present and warning of the Black Prince's plot). They are captured by the king’s guards and condemned to be beheaded. Eventually, the King realizes the plot and jails the Black Prince and his fellow plotter. Elaine is allowed to marry Cedric, and they all live happily ever after.

Cast

Credited
 Moe Howard as Moe
 Larry Fine as Larry
 Shemp Howard as Shemp
 Jock Mahoney as Cedric the Blacksmith
 Christine McIntyre as Princess Elaine
 Philip Van Zandt as Black Prince

Uncredited
 Vernon Dent as King Arthur
 Ruth Godfrey as Lady in waiting
 Harold Brauer as Sir Satchel (stock footage)
 Joe Palma as Sir Satchel (new footage)
 Robert Stevens as Guard in blacksmith shop, Guard giving chase in castle hallways (new footage)
 Joe Palma as Guard in blacksmith shop, Guard giving chase in castle hallways (new footage)
 Bill Clark as guard in courtyard
Kenner G. Kemp as guard in courtyard
 Douglas Coppin as King Arthur's personal guard
 Judy Malcolm as Woman in king's entourage

Production notes
Knutzy Knights is a remake of Squareheads of the Round Table (1948), using ample stock footage; new scenes were filmed on January 18–19, 1954.

Knutzy Knights is notable for being the last film featuring new footage of longtime Stooge foil Vernon Dent. Dent was aged 58 at the time of filming and losing his eyesight from the effects of Type 2 diabetes. (He would be completely blind by the time of Shemp Howard's death in November 1955.) Dent appeared in six more Stooge films after Knutzy Knights, via recycled footage: Of Cash and Hash, Bedlam in Paradise (both 1955), Flagpole Jitters, Rumpus in the Harem, Hot Stuff (all 1956), and Guns a Poppin (1957).

References

External links 
 
 
Knutzy Knights at threestooges.net

1954 films
1954 comedy films
The Three Stooges films
American black-and-white films
The Three Stooges film remakes
Fiction set in Roman Britain
Arthurian films
Films directed by Jules White
Columbia Pictures short films
1950s English-language films
American comedy short films
1950s American films